The following is a list of the women's national ice hockey players for the United States in various international competitions.

Winter Olympics

2014 Winter Olympics

2010 Winter Olympics

2006 Winter Olympics

(won bronze medal)
Caitlin Cahow - Harvard University
Julie Chu - Harvard University
Natalie Darwitz - University of Minnesota
Pam Dreyer - Brown University
Tricia Dunn-Luoma - University of New Hampshire
Molly Engstrom - University of Wisconsin
Chanda Gunn - Northeastern University
Jamie Hagerman - Harvard University
Kim Insalaco - Brown University
Kathleen Kauth - Brampton Thunder (NWHL)
Courtney Kennedy - University of Minnesota
Katie King - Brown University
Kristin King - Dartmouth College
Sarah Parsons - Noble & Greenough High School
Jenny Schmidgall-Potter - University of Minnesota-Duluth
Helen Resor - Yale University
Angela Ruggiero - Harvard University
Kelly Stephens - University of Minnesota
Lyndsay Wall - University of Minnesota
Krissy Wendell - University of Minnesota

2002 Winter Olympics 

(won silver medal)
Chris Bailey - Providence College
Laurie Baker - Providence College
Karyn Bye - University of New Hampshire
Julie Chu - Harvard University
Natalie Darwitz - University of Minnesota
Sara DeCosta - Providence College
Tricia Dunn-Luoma - University of New Hampshire
Cammi Granato - Vancouver Griffins (NWHL)
Courtney Kennedy - University of Minnesota
Andrea Kilbourne - Northwood School (High School)
Katie King - Brown University
Shelley Looney - Vancouver Griffins (NWHL)
Sue Merz - University of New Hampshire
A. J. Mleczko - Harvard University
Tara Mounsey - Brown University
Jenny Schmidgall-Potter - University of Minnesota-Duluth
Angela Ruggiero - Harvard University
Sarah Tueting - Dartmouth College
Lyndsay Wall - University of Minnesota
Krissy Wendell - University of Minnesota

1998 Winter Olympics
(won inaugural gold medal)
Chris Bailey - Providence College
Laurie Baker - Providence College
Alana Blahoski - Providence College
Lisa Brown-Miller - Providence College
Karyn Bye - University of New Hampshire
Colleen Coyne - University of New Hampshire
Sara DeCosta - Providence College
Tricia Dunn - University of New Hampshire
Cammi Granato - Providence College
Katie King - Brown University
Shelley Looney - US National Team
Sue Merz - US National Team
Allison Mleczko - Harvard University
Tara Mounsey - Concord High School
Vicki Movsessian - US National Team
Angela Ruggiero - Choate Rosemary Hall
Jenny Schmidgall - University of Minnesota-Duluth
Sarah Tueting - Dartmouth College
Gretchen Ulion - Dartmouth College
Sandra Whyte - Harvard University

IIHF World Women's Championships

2020 Roster
Roster for the 2020 IIHF Women's World Championship.

Head Coach: Bob Corkum

2011 Roster
The following is the American roster in the women's ice hockey tournament of the 2011 IIHF Women's World Championship.

2009 Women's World Ice Hockey Championships 

(won gold medal)

Goaltenders:

 Molly Schaus - Boston College
 Jessica Vetter - University of Wisconsin
 Megan van Beusekom - Minnesota Whitecaps

Defense:

 Kacey Bellamy - University of New Hampshire
 Caitlin Cahow - Minnesota Whitecaps
 Lisa Chesson - Minnesota Whitecaps
 Molly Engstrom - Minnesota Whitecaps
 Helen Resor - Yale University
 Angela Ruggiero - Minnesota Whitecaps
 Kerry Weiland - U.S. National Team

Forwards:

 Julie Chu - Minnesota Whitecaps
 Natalie Darwitz - U.S. National Team
 Meghan Duggan - University of Wisconsin
 Hilary Knight - University of Wisconsin
 Erika Lawler - University of Wisconsin
 Jocelyne Lamoureux - University of Minnesota
 Monique Lamoureux  - University of Minnesota
 Gigi Marvin - University of Minnesota
 Jenny Potter - Minnesota Whitecaps
 Kelli Stack - Boston College
 Karen Thatcher - Minnesota Whitecaps

2008 Women's World Ice Hockey Championships 

(won gold medal)

Goaltenders:

 Molly Schaus - Boston College
 Jessie Vetter - University of Wisconsin

Defense:

 Kacey Bellamy - University of New Hampshire
 Caitlin Cahow - Harvard University
 Julie Chu - Minnesota Whitecaps
 Rachael Drazan - University of Minnesota
 Molly Engstrom - Vaughan Flames
 Angela Ruggiero - Minnesota Whitecaps
 Kerry Weiland - Vaughan Flames

Forwards:

 Natalie Darwitz - Minnesota Whitecaps
 Meghan Duggan - University of Wisconsin
 Sami Faber - University of New Hampshire
 Hilary Knight - University of Wisconsin
 Jess Koizumi - Minnesota Whitecaps
 Erika Lawler - University of Wisconsin
 Gigi Marvin - University of Minnesota
 Sarah Parsons - Dartmouth College
 Jenny Potter - Minnesota Whitecaps
 Kelli Stack - Boston College
 Karen Thatcher - Vaughan Flames

2007 Women's World Ice Hockey Championships 

(won silver medal)

Goaltenders:

 Chanda Gunn - U.S. National Team
 Jessica Vetter - University of Wisconsin

Defense:

 Caitlin Cahow - Harvard University
 Molly Engstrom - U.S. National Team
 Kelli Halcisak - East Coast Wizards
 Helen Resor - Yale University
 Angela Ruggiero - U.S. National Team
 Kerry Weiland - Etobicoke Dolphins

Forwards:

 Julie Chu - Harvard University
 Natalie Darwitz - Minnesota Whitecaps
 Meghan Duggan - University of Wisconsin
 Tiffany Hagge - Mississauga Aeros
 Kristin King - Minnesota Whitecaps
 Hilary Knight - Choate Rosemary Hall
 Erika Lawler - University of Wisconsin
 Gigi Marvin - University of Minnesota
 Sarah Parsons - Dartmouth College
 Jenny Potter - U.S. National Team
 Krissy Wendell - Etobicoke Dolphins
 Jinelle Zaugg - University of Wisconsin

2005 Women's World Ice Hockey Championships

2004 Women's World Ice Hockey Championships

2001 Women's World Ice Hockey Championships 

(won silver medal)

Goaltenders:

 Sara DeCosta - U.S. Women National Team
 Sarah Tueting - U.S. Women National Team

Defense:

 Winny Brodt - U.S. Women National Team
 Karyn Bye - U.S. Women National Team
 Nicki Luongo - U.S. Women National Team
 Sue Merz - U.S. Women National Team
 A. J. Mleczko - U.S. Women National Team
 Angela Ruggiero - U.S. Women National Team

Forwards:

 Chris Bailey - U.S. Women National Team
 Alana Blahoski - U.S. Women National Team
 Julie Chu - U.S. Women National Team
 Natalie Darwitz - U.S. Women National Team
 Tricia Dunn - U.S. Women National Team
 Cammi Granato - U.S. Women National Team
 Annamarie Holmes - U.S. Women National Team
 Katie King - U.S. Women National Team
 Shelley Looney - U.S. Women National Team
 Jennifer Schmidgall - U.S. Women National Team
 Krissy Wendell - U.S. Women National Team
 Carisa Zaban - U.S. Women National Team

2000 IIHF Women's World Championship 

(won silver medal)

Goaltenders:

 Sara DeCosta - Providence College
 Sarah Tueting - U.S. Women's Select Team

Defense:

 Chris Bailey - U.S. Women's Select Team
 Winny Brodt - University of Minnesota
 Nicki Luongo - U.S. Women's Select Team
 Sue Merz - U.S. Women's Select Team
 Angela Ruggiero - Harvard University

Forwards:

 Laurie Baker - U.S. Women's Select Team
 Alana Blahoski - U.S. Women's Select Team
 Karyn Bye - U.S. Women's Select Team
 Natalie Darwitz - Eagan High School
 Tricia Dunn - U.S. Women's Select Team
 Brandy Fisher - U.S. Women's Select Team
 Cammi Granato - U.S. Women's Select Team
 Katie King - U.S. Women's Select Team
 Shelley Looney - U.S. Women's Select Team
 A. J. Mleczko - U.S. Women's Select Team
 Stephanie O'Sullivan - U.S. Women's Select Team
 Jennifer Schmidgall - University of Minnesota
 Krissy Wendell - Park Center Senior High School

1999 IIHF Women's World Championship

(won silver medal)

Goaltenders:

 Laurie Belliveau - Yale University
 Erin Whitten - US National Team

Defense:

 Chris Bailey - Providence College
 Amy Coelho - Dartmouth College
 Catherine Hanson - Providence College
 Sue Merz - US National Team
 Tara Mounsey - Brown University
 Angela Ruggiero - Harvard University

Forwards:

 Alana Blahoski - Providence College
 Karyn Bye - University of New Hampshire
 Natalie Darwitz - Eagan High School
 Tricia Dunn - US National Team
 Brandy Fisher - University of New Hampshire
 Cammi Granato - US National Team
 Sarah Hood - Dartmouth College
 Katie King - US National Team
 Shelley Looney - US National Team
 Steph O'Sullivan - US National Team
 Jennifer Schmidgall - US National Team
 Krissy Wendell - Park Center Senior High School

1997 IIHF Women's World Championship

(won silver medal)

Goaltenders:

 Sarah Tueting - Dartmouth College
 Erin Whitten - University of New Hampshire

Defense:

 Chris Bailey - Providence College
 Colleen Coyne - University of New Hampshire
 Tara Mounsey - Brown University
 Vicki Movsessian - University of New Hampshire
 Kelly O'Leary - Providence College
 Angela Ruggiero - Choate Rosemary Hall

Forwards:

 Laurie Baker - Providence College
 Alana Blahoski - Providence College
 Lisa Brown-Miller - Providence College
 Karyn Bye - University of New Hampshire
 Tricia Dunn - University of New Hampshire
 Cammi Granato - Providence College
 Katie King - Brown University
 Shelley Looney - Northeastern University
 Allison "AJ" Mleczko - Harvard University
 Steph O'Sullivan - Providence College
 Gretchen Ulion - Dartmouth College
 Sandra Whyte - Harvard University
 Barbara Gordon - Colby College (alternate)

1994 IIHF Women's World Championship

(won silver medal)

Goalies:

 Kelly Dyer - Northeastern University
 Jennifer Hanley - St. Thomas University
 Erin Whitten - University of New Hampshire

Defense:

 Chris Bailey - Providence College
 Colleen Coyne - University of New Hampshire
 Shawna Davidson - University of New Hampshire
 Shelly DiFronzo - University of New Hampshire
 Vicki Movsessian - University of New Hampshire
 Kelly O'Leary - Providence College

Forwards:

 Beth Beagan - Providence College
 Steph Boyd - University of Toronto
 Lisa Brown - Providence College
 Karyn Bye - University of New Hampshire
 Cindy Curley - Providence College
 Cammi Granato - Providence College
 Shelley Looney - Northeastern University
 Sue Merz - University of New Hampshire
 Steph O'Sullivan - Providence College
 Jeanine Sobek - Northeastern University
 Gretchen Ulion - Dartmouth College
 Sandra Whyte - Harvard University

1992 IIHF Women's World Championship

(won silver medal)

Goalies:

 Kelly Dyer - Assabet Valley Patriots (MBHL)
 Jennifer Hanley - Edina High School
 Erin Whitten - University of New Hampshire

Defense:

 Lauren Apollo - Assabet Valley Patriots (MBHL)
 Cindy Curley - Assabet Valley Patriots (MBHL)
 Shawna Davidson - University of New Hampshire
 Kelly O'Leary - Providence College
 Jeanine Sobek - Northeastern University
 Ellen Weinberg - University of New Hampshire

Forwards:

 Michele Amidon - Kingswood-Oxford School
 Beth Beagan - Providence College
 Lisa Brown - Providence College
 Karyn Bye - University of New Hampshire
 Colleen Coyne - University of New Hampshire
 Cammi Granato - Providence College
 Kim Haman - West Valley High
 Kathy Issel - Michigan Capitals
 Shelley Looney - Northeastern University
 Sue Merz - University of New Hampshire
 Tina Cardinale - Nighthawks Hockey
 Wendy Tatarouns - Assabet Valley Patriots (MBHL)
 Sandra Whyte - Harvard University

1990 IIHF Women's World Championship

(won silver medal)

Goalies:

 Kelly Dyer - Assabet Valley Patriots (MBHL)
 Mary Jones - University of Wisconsin–Madison

Defense:

 Lauren Apollo - Assabet Valley Patriots (MBHL)
 Yvonne Percy - Assabet Valley Patriots (MBHL)
 Sharon Stidsen - Nighthawks Hockey
 Kelley Owen - Bobcats Women's Ice Hockey
 Judy Parish - Dartmouth College
 Kelly O'Leary - Providence College

Forwards:

 Beth Beagan - Providence College
 Lisa Brown - Providence College and Coach - Princeton University
 Tina Cardinale - Nighthawks Hockey
 Heidi Chalupnik - University of New Hampshire
 Cindy Curley - Assabet Valley Patriots (MBHL)
 Shawna Davidson - University of New Hampshire
 Maria Dennis - Georgetown University
 Kimberly Eisenreid - Cheektowaga Hockey
 Cammi Granato - Providence College
 Sue Merz - Connecticut Polar Bears
 Julie Sasner - Assabet Valley Patriots (MBHL)
 Jeanine Sobek - Minnesota Thoroughbreds

See also
List of Canadian women's national ice hockey team rosters
United States women's national ice hockey team

References

United S
United States women's national ice hockey team
Lists of American sportswomen